Stephen Schiffer (born 1940) is an American philosopher and currently Silver Professor of Philosophy at New York University. He is a specialist in the philosophy of language.

Education and career

Schiffer was awarded a B.A. in philosophy from the University of Pennsylvania in 1962 and a Ph.D. in philosophy from Oxford University in 1970. He taught at the University of California, Berkeley, University of Arizona, and City University of New York before moving to NYU.  He was elected a fellow of the American Academy of Arts and Sciences in 2007.

Philosophical work

He has specialized in the philosophy of language, and is the author of three significant works concerning semantic meaning: Meaning (OUP, 1972), Remnants of Meaning (MIT Press, 1987), and The Things We Mean (OUP, 2003).

References

External links
 Schiffer's homepage

1940 births
University of Pennsylvania alumni
Philosophers of language
Living people
20th-century American philosophers
21st-century American philosophers
Alumni of the University of Oxford
American expatriates in the United Kingdom
University of California, Berkeley faculty
University of Arizona faculty
City University of New York faculty
New York University faculty